Metsovone is a semi-hard smoked pasta filata cheese produced in the Aromanian village of Metsovo in Epirus, Greece.  Metsovone has been a European protected designation of origin since 1996. This cheese, along with Metsovela, is one of the most popular culinary attractions of Metsovo. These cheeses are produced in the Tositsa Foundation Cheese Factory of Metsovo.

Metsovone is manufactured from cow's milk or a mixture of cow and sheep or goat milk.

See also
 List of cheeses
 List of smoked foods
 Cuisine of Greece
 Aromanian cuisine

References

Metsovo
Greek cheeses
Aromanian cuisine
Aromanians in Greece
Smoked cheeses
Cow's-milk cheeses
Greek products with protected designation of origin
Cheeses with designation of origin protected in the European Union